Creagrutus is a genus of characins found mostly in South America, with one species C. affinis extending into Panama in Central America.

Species
There are currently 71 recognized species in this genus:
 Creagrutus affinis Steindachner, 1880
 Creagrutus amoenus Fowler, 1943
 Creagrutus anary Fowler, 1913
 Creagrutus atratus Vari & Harold, 2001
 Creagrutus atrisignum G. S. Myers, 1927
 Creagrutus barrigai Vari & Harold, 2001
 Creagrutus beni C. H. Eigenmann, 1911 (Gold-stripe characin)
 Creagrutus bolivari L. P. Schultz, 1944
 Creagrutus brevipinnis C. H. Eigenmann, 1913
 Creagrutus britskii Vari & Harold, 2001
 Creagrutus calai Vari & Harold, 2001
 Creagrutus caucanus C. H. Eigenmann, 1913
 Creagrutus changae Vari & Harold, 2001
 Creagrutus cochui Géry, 1964
 Creagrutus cracentis Vari & Harold, 2001
 Creagrutus crenatus Vari & Harold, 2001
 Creagrutus ephippiatus Vari & Harold, 2001
 Creagrutus figueiredoi Vari & Harold, 2001
 Creagrutus flavescens Vari & Harold, 2001
 Creagrutus gephyrus J. E. Böhlke & Saul, 1975
 Creagrutus gracilis Vari & Harold, 2001
 Creagrutus guanes Torres-Mejia & Vari, 2005
 Creagrutus gyrospilus Vari & Harold, 2001
 Creagrutus hildebrandi L. P. Schultz, 1944
 Creagrutus holmi Vari & Harold, 2001
 Creagrutus hysginus Harold, Vari, Machado-Allison & Provenzano, 1994
 Creagrutus ignotus Vari & Harold, 2001
 Creagrutus kunturus Vari, Harold & H. Ortega, 1995
 Creagrutus lassoi Vari & Harold, 2001
 Creagrutus lepidus Vari, Harold, Lasso A. & Machado-Allison, 1993
 Creagrutus leuciscus Regan, 1913 
 Creagrutus machadoi Vari & Harold, 2001
 Creagrutus maculosus Román-Valencia, García-Alzate, Ruiz-C. & Taphorn, 2010
 Creagrutus magdalenae C. H. Eigenmann, 1913
 Creagrutus magoi Vari & Harold, 2001
 Creagrutus manu Vari & Harold, 2001
 Creagrutus maracaiboensis (L. P. Schultz, 1944)
 Creagrutus maxillaris (G. S. Myers, 1927)
 Creagrutus melanzonus C. H. Eigenmann, 1909
 Creagrutus melasma Vari, Harold & Taphorn, 1994
 Creagrutus menezesi Vari & Harold, 2001
 Creagrutus meridionalis Vari & Harold, 2001
 Creagrutus molinus Vari & Harold, 2001
 Creagrutus mucipu Vari & Harold, 2001
 Creagrutus muelleri (Günther, 1859)
 Creagrutus nigrostigmatus Dahl, 1960
 Creagrutus nigrotaeniatus D'Agosta & Pastana, 2014 
 Creagrutus occidaneus Vari & Harold, 2001
 Creagrutus ortegai Vari & Harold, 2001
 Creagrutus ouranonastes Vari & Harold, 2001
 Creagrutus paraguayensis Mahnert & Géry, 1988
 Creagrutus paralacus Harold & Vari, 1994
 Creagrutus pearsoni Mahnert & Géry, 1988
 Creagrutus peruanus (Steindachner, 1876)
 Creagrutus petilus Vari & Harold, 2001
 Creagrutus phasma G. S. Myers, 1927
 Creagrutus pila Vari & Harold, 2001
 Creagrutus planquettei Géry & Renno, 1989
 Creagrutus provenzanoi Vari & Harold, 2001
 Creagrutus runa Vari & Harold, 2001
 Creagrutus saxatilis Vari & Harold, 2001
 Creagrutus seductus Vari & Harold, 2001
 Creagrutus taphorni Vari & Harold, 2001
 Creagrutus tuyuka Vari & F. C. T. Lima, 2003
 Creagrutus ungulus Vari & Harold, 2001
 Creagrutus varii A. C. Ribeiro, Benine & C. A. A. Figueiredo, 2004
 Creagrutus veruina Vari & Harold, 2001
 Creagrutus vexillapinnus Vari & Harold, 2001
 Creagrutus xiphos Vari & Harold, 2001
 Creagrutus yanatili Harold & Salcedo, 2010
 Creagrutus zephyrus Vari & Harold, 2001

References

Characidae
Taxa named by Albert Günther